Buffalo Springs is an unincorporated community on Farm to Market Road 174 15 miles southeast of Henrietta in south central Clay County, Texas, United States. Two other towns by the same name exist in Texas, one in Lubbock County and the other in Comal County (now abandoned).

History
Settlement of the area began in 1864, when 25 families constructed an outpost and farming community. The settlers were under constant threat from marauding Native Americans, the same threat that had driven many Anglo settlers east back into Montague and Cooke counties.  In 1867, two companies of the Sixth United States Cavalry deployed from Jacksboro to establish an outpost and protect settlers from the raiding Indians. The lack of vegetation, timber, and water made the outpost difficult to maintain and the cavalry returned to Jacksboro and established Fort Richardson later that year.  Settlers finally returned in 1878, this time to stay.  That same year, Burnett family settlers petitioned for a post office called Buffalo Springs, named after the Buffalo Creek.  Buffalo Springs became a farming hub for the area and reached a population zenith of 200 in 1890.  Bypassed by every major thoroughfare and railroad through the county, the town declined and its school, post office, and all of its businesses eventually closed.

Education
The Buffalo Springs area is served by the Midway Independent School District and the Bellevue Independent School District.

References

Unincorporated communities in Texas
Unincorporated communities in Clay County, Texas
Wichita Falls metropolitan area